Cheiracanthiidae is a family of araneomorph spiders first described by Vladimir Wagner in 1887. The synonym Eutichuridae was used for a long time, but Cheiracanthiidae has priority. The largest genus currently recognized as belonging to this family is Cheiracanthium, which has previously been placed in both the Clubionidae and the Miturgidae.

Taxonomy
It was recognized as a synonym of "Eutichuridae" in 2009, but was in danger of becoming obsolete until it was resurrected in 2011.

The group was originally described as the subfamily Eutichurinae of the family Miturgidae by Pekka T. Lehtinen in 1967. The monophyly of the group is described as "reasonably uncontroversial", but it has been placed in either the Miturgidae or the Clubionidae. An analysis by Martín J. Ramírez in 2014 suggested that it was better considered as a separate family.

Genera
, the World Spider Catalog accepts the following genera:

Calamoneta Deeleman-Reinhold, 2001 — Indonesia
Calamopus Deeleman-Reinhold, 2001 — Thailand, Indonesia
Cheiracanthium C. L. Koch, 1839 — Europe, Asia, Africa, Oceania, Argentina
Cheiramiona Lotz & Dippenaar-Schoeman, 1999 — Africa, Egypt
Ericaella Bonaldo, 1994 — Brazil, Panama, Peru
Eutichurus Simon, 1897 — South America, India, Central America
Eutittha Thorell, 1878 — Asia, Australia
Lessertina Lawrence, 1942 — South Africa
Macerio Simon, 1897 — Chile, Argentina
Radulphius Keyserling, 1891 — Brazil
Sinocanthium Yu & Li, 2020 — China
Strotarchus Simon, 1888 — Pakistan, Costa Rica, North America, Brazil
Summacanthium Deeleman-Reinhold, 2001 — Indonesia
Tecution Benoit, 1977 — St. Helena

References

 
Araneomorphae families